Canet de Mar is a municipality in the comarca of the Maresme in Catalonia, Spain. It is situated on the coast between Arenys de Mar and Sant Pol de Mar.  and el Montnegre ranges. It is a tourist centre, but is also known for the cultivation of flowers and strawberries and for having several modernist style buildings. It is served by the main N-II road along the coast, the highway C-32 and by a station on the RENFE railway line. Canet de Mar is in the province of Barcelona (Spain), 43 kilometers from Barcelona.

Demography

Transport
The railway station belongs to en Barcelona-Mataro-Maçanet Massanes (R1) in Neighborhoods. Bus line St. Cyprian of Vallalta - Canet de Mar - Sant Pol de Mar - Calella either way, the company Sagalés. The motorway C-32 of Montgat in Palafolls and the N II on the coast of Barcelona in the Juncal.

Beaches
Canet is a municipality of Maresme Coast. Its coast consists of a sandy due to the decomposition of granite rocks which form the basement Canetenc; beaches are flat and with an average width of 50m mainly golden sand and thick, and have easy access on foot or cycling. The quality of the beach strip is the protection of coastal vegetation, where there are native plants of coastal Catalonia and Maresme. They are marked with buoys 200 meters, and there are input and output channel for boats.

Canet Beach
Canet Beach is located between the beach and Cavaió, 1,500 m long and is a city beach. It has several places to eat and drink all along the seafront, and in recent years has been classified as blue flag given by the European Union.

Cavaió Beach
Cavaió Beach is located between the beach of Canet and the municipality of Arenys de Mar, 1000 m long, and is a semi-urban beach. Its composition is sandy, with granite rocks. There is a project for a promenade that links Arenys de Mar, the remodeled the coast with several breakwaters to protect the beach from storms.

Festivals and Cultural Events
 Fair Market Modernist (September)
 Twelfth Night (January 5)
 Gathering Pedracastell (May 1)
 Re-Percussion Festival for the Odeon (June)
 Feast of St. Peter (June 29)
 Magic Night, which takes place during the festival, which is an international event for the performing arts on the street
 Classical Music Festival at Castell de Santa Florentina (July–August) Catalonia
 Winter festival, the day of the Our Lady of Mercy (September 8)

Buildings of Interest

Various Churches of the village

Various architectural works by Lluís Domènech i Montaner
The summer residence of modernist architect, Lluis Domenech i Montaner (1849-1923) was situated in Canet de Mar. Montaner married a native of Canet and his family spent time at their Summer residence. Two of Montaner's sons also married girls from Canet. In his later years, Montaner retired to Canet where he worked on many of his research projects and wrote his books from the studio situated at the rear of the Montaner home.

During his time in Canet, Montaner constructed a number of buildings - most of which are still standing and in very good condition. Casa Montaner, the family home, consists of a purpose built home as well as renovations to the 16th century Masia Racosa which would become Montaner's studio. Today this complex houses a museum devoted to Montaner, the so-called "father of Modernism". Other  works in the central part of town include: Ateneu de Canet and Casa Roura (now a restaurant). The Pantheon of the Montaner family is further out of town, Montaner's renovations to the Castle of Santa Florentine are examples of his work.

Various architectural works by Puig i Cadafalch.

Various architectural works by Pere Domènech i Roura.

Various architectural works by Eduard Ferrés i Puig

Notable people 
 Jordi Amat (born 21 March 1992) is a Indonesian professional footballer who plays for Malaysian club Johor Darul Ta'zim as a central defender.
 Julian Alonso (born 2 August 1977) is a former tennis player who was ranked number 30 in the ATP World Tour and also played Davis Cup several Years and Co-captain  of the Davis Cup 2015

References

 Panareda Clopés, Josep Maria; Rios Calvet, Jaume; Rabella Vives, Josep Maria (1989). Guia de Catalunya, Barcelona: Caixa de Catalunya.  (Spanish).  (Catalan).

External links

Official website 
 Government data pages 
Historic and artistic heritage 

Municipalities in Maresme
Populated places in Maresme
Seaside resorts in Spain